Gregory Kerr-Wilson is a bishop of the Anglican Church of Canada. He is the current Archbishop of Calgary.

Kerr-Wilson is a graduate of the University of British Columbia and Nashotah House Theological Seminary. He was ordained to the priesthood in 1990, beginning his ministry as curate of St. Paul's, Bloor Street, Toronto. He then was rector of the Church of the Holy Family, Brampton, then Dean of Edmonton before his ordination to the episcopate in the Diocese of Qu'Appelle on May 23, 2006.

On June 16, 2012, Kerr-Wilson was elected Bishop of Calgary. His enthronement occurred on September 29, 2012.

On June 18, 2015, Kerr-Wilson was elected as the Metropolitan of Rupert's Land. He was installed on June 21, 2015.

In 2019, Kerr-Wilson was a candidate for Primate of the Anglican Church of Canada, but was not successful, coming in third.

Notes

Living people
Nashotah House alumni
University of British Columbia alumni
Deans of Edmonton
21st-century Anglican Church of Canada bishops
Anglican bishops of Qu'Appelle
Anglican bishops of Calgary
Year of birth missing (living people)